Steel Cowboy is a 1978 American made-for-television drama film starring James Brolin, Rip Torn, Jennifer Warren, Strother Martin and Melanie Griffith. It was originally broadcast on NBC on December 6, 1978.

Plot
With his marriage, sanity and livelihood on the line, an independent trucker and his buddy agree to haul a load of stolen cattle for a black marketer.

Cast
James Brolin as Clayton Pfanner
Rip Torn as K.W. Hicks
Jennifer Warren as Jesse Pfanner
Strother Martin as Pinky Pincus
Melanie Griffith as Johnnie
Julie Cobb as Gloria

Reception
The Los Angeles Times said the film had some "nice characterizations but precious little story."

It was the 42nd highest rated show of the week.

References

External links
Steel Cowboy at TCMDB
Steel Cowboy at BFI
Steel Cowboy at IMDb

1978 television films
1978 films
1970s buddy drama films
American buddy drama films
Trucker films
NBC network original films
1970s American films